David John McIntyre (born February 4, 1987) is a Canadian professional ice hockey forward who is currently playing with Kölner Haie of the Deutsche Eishockey Liga (DEL).

Playing career
As a youth, McIntyre played in the 2001 Quebec International Pee-Wee Hockey Tournament with a minor ice hockey team from Whitby, Ontario.

McIntyre was selected by the Dallas Stars in the 5th round (138th overall) of the 2006 NHL Entry Draft.

On December 14, 2008, the Dallas Stars traded McIntyre and a 2010 sixth-round draft pick (Andreas Dahlstrom) to the Anaheim Ducks in exchange for Brian Sutherby. On February 3, 2009, the Ducks traded Mcintyre to the New Jersey Devils in exchange for Sheldon Brookbank.

He attended Colgate University from 2006 to 2010, serving as captain his senior season, while receiving the Terry Slater Trophy ("goes to the senior whose performance, leadership, and dedication on and off the ice during his career had the greatest impact on Colgate hockey") and the Rob Ries Memorial Award ("presented annually to a player who provides inspiration and leadership") and landing a spot on the All-ECAC Hockey Second Team.

Following the conclusion of the 2010–11 season, McIntyre was traded from the Devils to the Minnesota Wild for Maxim Noreau on June 16, 2011.  McIntyre scored his first NHL goal on January 14, 2012 against Jaroslav Halak of the St. Louis Blues.

On July 25, 2013, McIntyre signed a one-year AHL contract with the Grand Rapids Griffins. In the 2013–14 season with the Griffins, McIntyre contributed with 8 goals and 21 points in 64 games.

McIntyre left North America to sign his first contract abroad on June 11, 2014, in agreeing to a one-year deal with Finnish Liiga club, SaiPa. After having his contract renewed, he led SaiPa in scoring in 2015-16, tallying 56 points (16 goals, 40 assists) in 58 games, which also ranked him second in the league. In April 2016, he signed a two-year deal with EV Zug of the Swiss top-flight National League A (NLA). In late December 2017, he helped Team Canada win gold at the Spengler Cup in Davos, scoring one goal in the championship game. In early December 2019, EV Zug assigned McIntyre to the EVZ Academy of the Swiss League, before releasing him on December 12, 2019. He had put up only 5 points through 20 NL games this season. On December 13, 2019, McIntyre joined HC Lugano on a one-year deal for the remainder of the 2019–20 season.

During the 2021–22 season, having returned for a second stint in the Liiga with SaiPa, McIntyre left the club mid-season to join German club, Kölner Haie of the DEL, for the remainder of the campaign.

After a successful tenure with Kölner Haie, McIntyre was re-signed to a one-year contact extension on July 15, 2022.

Career statistics

Awards and honours

References

External links

1987 births
Living people
AHCA Division I men's ice hockey All-Americans
Albany Devils players
Canadian ice hockey centres
Colgate Raiders men's ice hockey players
Dallas Stars draft picks
Grand Rapids Griffins players
Houston Aeros (1994–2013) players
Ice hockey people from Ontario
Kölner Haie players
Lowell Devils players
HC Lugano players
Minnesota Wild players
People from the Regional Municipality of York
SaiPa players
EC Red Bull Salzburg players
EV Zug players